2483 Guinevere  is a dark and elongated Hilda asteroid from the outermost regions of the asteroid belt, approximately  in diameter. The asteroid was discovered on 17 August 1928, by German astronomer Max Wolf at Heidelberg Observatory in southwest Germany and given the provisional designation . In the 1980s, it was named after King Arthur's wife Guinevere.

Classification and orbit

Hildian asteroid 

Located in the outermost part of the main-belt, Guinevere is a member of the Hilda family, a large group of asteroids that are thought to have originated from the Kuiper belt. They orbit in a 3:2 orbital resonance with the gas giant Jupiter, meaning that for every 2 orbits Jupiter completes around the Sun, a Hildian asteroid will complete 3 orbits. Based on a numerical integration, Guinevere is the Hilda asteroid with the greatest chance of impacting with another asteroid. About 74% of the impact risk occurs when Guinevere is relatively close to perihelion and approaches the main-belt asteroids.

Orbit 

Guinevere orbits the Sun at a distance of 2.9–5.1 AU once every 7 years and 11 months (2,890 days). Its orbit has an eccentricity of 0.28 and an inclination of 5° with respect to the ecliptic. The body's observation arc begins two nights after its official discovery observation at Heidelberg in August 1928.

Naming 

This affair lead to civil war between King Arthur and his chief knight, who rescued Guinevere from burning at the stake, and initiated the downfall of Arthur's idyllic kingdom. The name was suggested by Frederick Pilcher and the proposal was submitted by Edward Bowell, who also made the object's key identification. The approved naming citation was published by the Minor Planet Center on 24 July 1983.

Physical characteristics

Lightcurves 

During a survey of Hilda asteroids in the 1990s, a rotational lightcurve of Guinevere was obtained from photometric observations by an international collaboration of Swedish, German and Italian astronomers. Lightcurve analysis gave a well-defined rotation period of 14.733 hours with a brightness variation of 1.38 magnitude. Guinevere is a high-amplitude Hilda. A high brightness amplitude typically indicates that the body is elongated and has a non-spheroidal shape. Thermal emission measurements from the Wide-field Infrared Survey Explorer (WISE) gave an even higher amplitude of 1.53 magnitude. In October 2016, another lightcurve of Guinevere was obtained at the Center for Solar System Studies (CS3), Landers, in the Southern California desert, during a photometric survey conducted by American astronomers Dan Coley, Robert Stephens and Brian Warner. It showed a period of 14.730 hours with an amplitude of 0.89 magnitude.

A 2016-published lightcurve, using modeled photometric data from the Lowell Photometric Database (LPD), gave a concurring period of 14.73081 hours, as well as two spin axis of (19.0°, 70.0°) and (194.0°, 59.0°) in ecliptic coordinates (λ, β).

Diameter and albedo 

According to the surveys carried out by the Infrared Astronomical Satellite IRAS, the Japanese Akari satellite, and the NEOWISE mission of NASA's WISE spacecraft, Guinevere measures between 35.687 and 44.17 kilometers in diameter and its surface has an albedo between 0.0433 and 0.067. The Collaborative Asteroid Lightcurve Link agrees with IRAS and derives an albedo of 0.0396 and a diameter of 44.14 kilometers based on an absolute magnitude of 10.9.

Notes

References

External links 
 Lightcurve Database Query (LCDB), at www.minorplanet.info
 Dictionary of Minor Planet Names, Google books
 Asteroids and comets rotation curves, CdR – Geneva Observatory, Raoul Behrend
 Discovery Circumstances: Numbered Minor Planets (1)-(5000) – Minor Planet Center
 
 

002483
Discoveries by Max Wolf
Named minor planets
19280817